James Ashman  (1935–2006), was an England international lawn bowler.

Bowls career
Ashman gained his first England cap in 1976 and remained an international until 1981.

He represented England in the pairs event, at the 1978 Commonwealth Games in Edmonton, Alberta, Canada.

He won eleven Yorkshire County Championships and three Northern Counties between 1975 and 1989.

References

1935 births
2006 deaths
English male bowls players
Bowls players at the 1978 Commonwealth Games
Commonwealth Games competitors for England